Estonia competed at the 2000 Summer Olympics in Sydney, Australia. 33 competitors, 31 men and 2 women, took part in 29 events in 11 sports.

Medalists

Athletics

Men
Track & road events

Field events

Combined events – Decathlon

Canoeing

Sprint
Men

Cycling

Road

Fencing

Four fencers, all men, represented Estonia in 2000.
Men

Judo

Men

Modern pentathlon

Rowing

Men

Sailing

Estonia competed in three events in the Sailing competition of the Sydney Olympics. The highest they placed in any event was 22nd.

Men

Open

Shooting

Men

Swimming

Men

Women

Wrestling

Men's Greco-Roman

Notes
Wallechinsky, David (2004). The Complete Book of the Summer Olympics (Athens 2004 Edition). Toronto, Canada. .
International Olympic Committee (2001). The Results. Retrieved 12 November 2005.
Sydney Organising Committee for the Olympic Games (2001). Official Report of the XXVII Olympiad Volume 1: Preparing for the Games. Retrieved 20 November 2005.
Sydney Organising Committee for the Olympic Games (2001). Official Report of the XXVII Olympiad Volume 2: Celebrating the Games. Retrieved 20 November 2005.
Sydney Organising Committee for the Olympic Games (2001). The Results. Retrieved 20 November 2005.
International Olympic Committee Web Site

References

External links
 EOK – Sydney 2000 

Summer Olympics
Nations at the 2000 Summer Olympics
2000 Summer Olympics